Joseph Bakosoro also known as Bangasi Joseph Bakosoro is a South Sudanese politician. He is current Minister of public service in central Equatoria, Juba. He served as governor of Western Equatoria after winning an election over Nunu Kumba, serving from 26 May 2010 to August 2015, at which time he was arrested by security officials of South Sudan for suspicions to his being linked with the arrow, an armed local defense force originally formed to protect local communities from attacks by the Lord's Resistance Army, later released on April 27, 2016. 

He rejoined SPLM on 15 July 2021 and currently he is the Minister of Public Service of the Republic of South Sudan, Central Equatoria State Juba.

Sanctions 
Bakosoro was dismissed by the presidential decree in August 2015.He was removed as governor of Western Equatoria State in August 2015 together with the governor of Central Equatoria Clement Wani, Governor of Warrap Nyadeng Malek and Governor of Upper Nile state  Simon Kun Poch.

References

South Sudanese politicians
Living people
South Sudanese state governors
Year of birth missing (living people)
People from Western Equatoria